Nesher Beer (Hebrew: בירה נשר) (Beera Nesher) is a brand of Israeli beer and non-alcoholic malt beverages.

History

Nesher Beer was the country's first industrially brewed beer. It was a joint French-Palestine venture.  Production began in 1935 at the "Palestine Brewery Ltd" in Bat Yam. The distinctive, spread-wing eagle logo, still used today, was selected in a public competition advertised in the Palestine Post.

Today Nesher Beer is produced by Tempo Beer Industries in Netanya.

Beers 
Nesher Beer is a pale lager beer produced from various grains. It is a light beer, defined as a Schankbier.  Nesher Malt (or black beer) is non-alcoholic. It has a sweet taste and is sold in glass bottles of 330 ml or 500 ml and in 1.5 liter plastic bottles.

See also 
 Beer in Israel

References

External links
 Official website (Hebrew)

Products introduced in 1935
Beer in Israel
Non-alcoholic drinks